A.P. Mica Mine Workers Union, a trade union of mica mine labourers in the Gudur minefields in Andhra Pradesh, India. APMMU is affiliated to All India Trade Union Congress. APMMU claims a membership of 1200 out of a total of 7000 workers.

Andhra Pradesh is one of the three leading areas where mica is mined in India. India produces roughly 62% of the world's mica but in recent years other materials substituting mica in its main applications (such as electronics) have impacted the price and mining of mica in India.

References
PUCL
MM&P mica mining India overview

Trade unions in India
All India Trade Union Congress
Mining trade unions
Trade unions in Andhra Pradesh
Year of establishment missing